DVAS (Dietzche V. & the Abominable Snowman) is a Canadian electronic dance music group formed in 2003 in Toronto.  DVAS signed to Upper Class Recordings, the Toronto-based label responsible for notable artists The Russian Futurists, Cadence Weapon, Girlsareshort (MSTRKRFT Al-P's original project) and The Cansecos in 2009.

With a basis in Disco and Hi-NRG, DVAS was co-founded by Canadian musicians Jered Stuffco and Darren Veres in 2003 in Edmonton, Alberta.

Albums

Macho
Macho documents the group from its very beginnings with a number of its singles and some new and some not widely available tracks.
Michael Douglas was the muse for Black Rain, one of 10 tracks on their latest collection, Macho. (Douglas also starred in a 1991 crime film of the same name.) "The movie's great and Michael Douglas is an icon," smiles Darren Veres.  It's obviously a huge joke," adds Jered Stuffco.
Recorded and mixed in Edmonton via computer—the disc required patience, humor and, above all, high-speed internet connections and trust. Some songs required two weeks of edits and dozens of e-mails between band mates.

Mixtapes and Remixes
DVAS have released three Internet-only mixtapes, a slew of remixes, and the track "Inner Sanctum" featured on the 2009 France based blog turned label, Valerie: "Valerie And Friends" Compilation.

Discography
DVAS MACHO (2007, Pop Echo Records: CAN)
Society (2010, Upper Class Recordings: CAN)

References
Citations

External links
DVAS Musique
 DVAS Myspace
 Upper Class Recordings

Musical groups established in 2003
Musical groups from Toronto
Canadian dance music groups
2003 establishments in Ontario